Patients Know Best is a British social enterprise, with an aim of putting patients in control of their own medical records.  In the UK, Patients Know Best integrates into the NHS app and in the Netherlands, it integrates with the government's personal  health records infrastructure  (PGO). Its Chairman is Dr Richard Smith.  Dr Mohammad Al-Ubaydli is the founder and chief executive officer.

The system is the preferred personal health record for London.  It is in use in 22 different languages at more than 60 hospitals throughout the UK, Ireland, Germany, Hong Kong, the US and the Netherlands.

After trials conducted by Abertawe Bro Morgannwg University Health Board it is to be rolled out across Wales in 2017.

In July 2019 it formed a partnership with HealthUnlocked, integrating their eSocial Prescription capability to enable more  holistic, personalised care plans.

References

External links
 

Social enterprises
Electronic health records